The Canadians is a 1961 Anglo–Canadian CinemaScope Western film written and directed by Burt Kennedy. It starred Robert Ryan, John Dehner and Torin Thatcher.

It was Kennedy's directorial debut.

Plot
A group of Sioux come to shelter in Canada from the Indian wars in the United States following Custer's last stand at the Battle of the Little Bighorn.  They are given permission to remain by the Canadian government represented by three Mounties.   Indian-fighters from Montana searching for 40 stolen horses discover the Sioux settlement and mistakenly assume their horses are theirs.  In the white men's surprise attack they murder many Indians, steal many horses, and kidnap an integrated white young woman recognized as having been kidnapped in a raid years earlier. The Mounties promise justice, track, capture, and begin the week-long ride to a trial at court.  During the week tables turn back and forth, backstories shared, some discussion about American gun culture and violence, and the woman is killed.  Eventually the men are lured to what may be their lost horses but a stampede erupts and the Sioux manage to drive the white men over the cliff like buffaloes to their death.  Without a shot fired and the deal maintained the Sioux remain in Canada while the Mounties return to their fort where the senior will finally retire.

In response the North-West Mounted Police are formed, the forerunner to the Royal Canadian Mounted Police.

Cast
 Robert Ryan ... Inspector William Gannon
 John Dehner ... Frank Boone
 Torin Thatcher ... Sgt. McGregor
 Burt Metcalfe ... Constable Springer
 John Sutton ... Superintendent Walker
 Jack Creley ... Greer
 Scott Peters ... Ben
 Richard Alden ... Billy
 Teresa Stratas ... White woman
 Michael Pate ... Chief Four Horns

Production
The film was the directorial debut of Burt Kennedy, who had established himself by the late 1950s as one of the leading writers of Westerns. It was originally called Royal Canadian Mounted.

Kennedy later recalled, "I didn't know what I was doing. I remember the first shot had like 400 horses in it, and I got the shot and the cameraman said, 'What do we do now?' And I thought, 'You mean I gotta do more?' So that's the reason I went into television [after The Canadians] to find out how you shoot pictures."

He also said "I had a wonderful cameraman... it was beautiful country... the story was pretty good actually, because it was based on an actual event, but – I was so used to playing scenes in Randy [Randolph Scott] pictures, I thought I could get away with them. But I couldn't. You can play good scenes with bad actors and (they're going to be) bad scenes. So I trapped myself... [Robert Ryan looked] like he didn't know what he was doing. It wasn't his fault. He was so grim in it. And the picture was so grim."

References

External links
 
 

1961 films
1961 Western (genre) films
1960s historical drama films
1961 directorial debut films
20th Century Fox films
CinemaScope films
British Western (genre) films
British historical drama films
Canadian Western (genre) films
Canadian historical drama films
English-language Canadian films
1960s English-language films
Films directed by Burt Kennedy
Films scored by Douglas Gamley
Films set in the 19th century
Films set in the Canadian Prairies
Royal Canadian Mounted Police in fiction
1960s Canadian films
1960s British films